Shaanxi Automobile Group Co., Ltd. is a Chinese bus and truck manufacturer with headquarters in Xi'an, Shaanxi, China.

Overview 
It employs approximately 23,000 employees. It manufactures medium-size and heavy-duty trucks (both branded as Shacman), bus chassis and heavy-duty truck axles. It utilizes Magna Steyr and MAN SE technologies. Its bus chassis are sold under the Eurostar Bus brand.

Shaanxi Automobile Group Co. Ltd entered into a joint venture with Rawal Industrial Equipment (Pvt) Ltd, Pakistan to manufacture trucks & prime movers locally.

Products

Heavy Duty Vehicles

Shaanxi SX2150
Shaanxi SX2190
X6000 (2020–present)
X5000 (2019–present)
X3000 (2014–present)
M3000 (2011–present)
F3000 (2009–present)
F2000 (2003–present)

Light Commercial Vehicles
The light commercial vehicle products of Shaanxi Automobile Group are electric light commercial vehicles sold under the Shaanxi Tongjia brand.
Shaanxi Tongjia Longrui
Shaanxi Tongjia Fujia
Shaanxi Tongjia Dianniu No.2
Shaanxi Tongjia Dianniu No.3
Shaanxi Tongjia Dianniu 3F

References

External links

 Official (Chinese)
 Worldwide (English)

Weichai Group
Manufacturing companies based in Xi'an
Truck manufacturers of China
Vehicle manufacturing companies established in 1968
Bus manufacturers of China